Capsicum eximium is a member of the genus Capsicum with 2n=2x=24, and native to the New World, specifically the Andean region of South America. It is one of the "purple-flowered" Capsicums along with Capsicum cardenasii and Capsicum pubescens. Like most other chili peppers, it is both pungent and self-compatible. It is a member of the Pubescens complex, a natural group of highly related Capsicums. Natural hybrids between C. pubescens as well as C. tovarii have been found, further supporting the relationship of these species.

Plant description
Capsicum eximium is identified by its distinctive purple flowers. The flowers have an entire calyx and bell-shaped corolla that come in various shades of purple. Mature fruit of C. eximium are small, shiny, non-pulpy berries. The seeds are yellow.

Uses
In Bolivia, where the plants occur naturally, C. eximium is used as a spice. Also, since it is a wild pepper species, it has been used extensively in phylogenetic studies to better understand the relationships of peppers and different gene models.

References

eximium